Diphu Pass is a mountain pass around the area of the disputed tri-point borders of India, China, and Myanmar. Diphu Pass is also a strategic approach to eastern Arunachal Pradesh in India. It lies on the McMahon Line. It is located in Anjaw district of Arunachal Pradesh, 120 km northeast of district headquarter at Hawai via Hawai-Walong-Dong-Kibithu-Kaho-Dhipu Pass route. Kaho on LAC is 40 km west of Dhipu Pass. Walong airstrip, 60 km away, has the nearest air connectivity.

In October 1960 China and Burma demarcated their border to the Diphu Pass, which is 5 miles south of the watershed of the mountain ranges. However, this caused a diplomatic row with India, which expected the tri-point to be at the watershed. The dispute has become part of the ongoing border disagreement between China and India regarding Arunachal Pradesh.

See also
Sino-Indian border dispute

References

Mountain passes of China
Mountain passes of India
Mountain passes of Myanmar
Mountain passes of Tibet
Mountain passes of Arunachal Pradesh
China–India border crossings
Borders of Arunachal Pradesh